Stephen P. "Steve" Pougnet (born April 27, 1963) is an American businessman and Democratic politician who served as the mayor of Palm Springs, California from 2007 to 2015.

Background
Pougnet was born in Flint, Michigan. Pougnet earned his Bachelor of Arts in business from Michigan State University in 1985 and was elected to the Palm Springs City Council in 2003. In 2017, he was accused of receiving $375,000 in bribes from John Wessman and Richard Meany, land and property developers of the Palm Springs area. Pougnet is currently awaiting arraignment on corruption charges. He is free on $25,000 bail.

Positions held
 Vice Chairman of the Coachella Valley Association of Governments (CVAG)
 Chairman of the Energy & Water Conservation Subcommittee
 Vice Chairman of the CVAG Energy and Environment Committee
 Vice Chairman of Sunline Transit Agency, the region’s public transportation management organization
 Board Member of the Palm Springs Desert Resort Convention Visitors Authority
 Member of the Riverside County Transportation Commission.
 Riverside County Indian Gaming Local Community Benefit Committee.
Mayor of Palm Springs until bribery charges were brought against him. He currently faces 21 felony counts, including perjury, public corruption and conspiracy.

Family
Pougnet is openly gay. He married Christopher Green in 2008, and they have two twin children named Beckham and Julia.

Elections
In 2010, Pougnet ran unopposed in the June 2010 primary election to win the Democratic nomination for the United States House of Representatives seat representing California's 45th congressional district. In the November 2010 election, he ran against American Independent Bill Lussenheide and Republican incumbent, Mary Bono Mack. Bono Mack defeated both Pougnet and Lussenheide in the general election.

See also
 List of Mayors of Palm Springs, California

References

External links

1963 births
Living people
California Democrats
Gay politicians
LGBT mayors of places in the United States
Mayors of Palm Springs, California
Politicians from Flint, Michigan
LGBT people from Michigan
LGBT people from California